The 1962–63 St. Francis Terriers men's basketball team represented St. Francis College during the 1962–63 NCAA men's basketball season. The team was coached by Daniel Lynch, who was in his fifteenth year at the helm of the St. Francis Terriers. The team was a member of the Metropolitan New York Conference and played their home games at the 69th Regiment Armory in Manhattan.

The Terriers finished the season at 16–7 overall and 4–2 in conference play. The Terriers participated in the 1963 National Invitation Tournament. St. Francis and Fordham were the only local teams to be invited. They lost in the first round to Miami, 70–71. It was a match-up of the second-best offense in the country, Miami, against the fourth-best defense in the country, St. Francis. The Terriers almost pulled off the upset.

Roster

Schedule and results

|-
!colspan=12 style="background:#0038A8; border: 2px solid #CE1126;;color:#FFFFFF;"| Regular Season

  

  

 

|-
!colspan=5 style="background:#0038A8; border: 2px solid #CE1126;;color:#FFFFFF;"|National Invitation Tournament

1963 National Invitation Tournament

Below is the tournament bracket.

References

St. Francis Brooklyn Terriers men's basketball seasons
St. Francis
St. Francis
Saint Francis
Saint Francis